Patrick Hombergen (born 8 September 1946) is a former professional tennis player from Belgium.

Biography
Hombergen was a regular Davis Cup representative for Belgium, the fourth to feature in 20 ties. From 1966 to 1980 he played in a total of 21 ties and had a 26/31 overall record, 15/24 in singles and 11/7 in doubles. He won a five set match over Jan Kodeš in Brussels in 1968, from two sets down.

In Grand Slam competition he had his best results in 1972 when he made the second round of the French Open and third round of the Wimbledon Championships. At the 1972 French Open he also reached the third round of the doubles with Davis Cup teammate Bernard Mignot and en route the Belgians caused an upset with a win over the second seeded pairing of Ilie Năstase and Ion Țiriac.

His career on the Grand Prix circuit involved four quarter-final appearances, three in 1972, at Brussels, Gstaad and Hilversum. The other came at Barcelona in 1973 and that year he also made a doubles final, with Bernard Mignot in Valencia, which they lost to Mike Estep and Ion Țiriac.

Grand Prix career finals

Doubles: 1 (0–1)

See also
List of Belgium Davis Cup team representatives

References

External links
 
 
 

1946 births
Living people
Belgian male tennis players
Sportspeople from Brussels
20th-century Belgian people